Della, Della, Cha-Cha-Cha is an album by singer and actress Della Reese. It is an album of standards, performed with a cha-cha-cha rhythm and beat. The album was recorded in New York City in 1960, and it was conducted by O. B. Masingill.

Track listing

References

1961 albums
Della Reese albums
RCA Victor albums